Manny the Frenchie (born February 7, 2011) is a French Bulldog from Chicago, Illinois, that achieved Internet celebrity via the posting of his photographs on various social media websites. In 2013 he was the world's most followed and popular Bulldog on the Internet. Between his channels and the Manny and Friends channels, they reach over 4 million followers worldwide.

Manny is owned by Amber Chavez and Jon Huang and was named after the Filipino boxer Manny Pacquiao. His social media presence, as of December 2014, Manny has more than 20,000 followers on Twitter, more than 1.4 million "likes" on Facebook and more than 900,000 followers on Instagram. He has been used as a canine model for consumer Martha Stewart's PetSmart line and has been featured on Steve Harvey's television talk show. In 2016 Manny was awarded The CW's World Dog Award for Most Pawpular and Influential dog.

See also
 List of individual dogs

References

External links 

2011 animal births
Animals on the Internet
Dogs in popular culture
Male mammals
Individual dogs in the United States
Internet memes